Todd Esselmont (born November 5, 1971 in Kamloops, British Columbia) is a professional hockey player, who played both ice and roller hockey professionally. His position is a centre.

His junior hockey career started in the 1988-1989 season, toiling back and forth between the Kamloops Blazers of the Western Hockey League, and the Penticton Knights of the British Columbia Junior Hockey League. In his stint with Penticton that year, he recorded 14 goals, 18 assists, 32 points, and 44 PIM's in 44 games. He would play two more seasons in Kamloops before playing with the Swift Current Broncos for one season and the Tri-City Americans for two more seasons. His junior career ended in the BCJHL, playing for the Bellingham Ice Hawks.

In 1993 and 1994 respectively, he played in Roller Hockey International for the Vancouver Voodoo. His 1993 season finished successfully, as he ranked 5th in RHI's scoring title.

For the 1997-1998 season, he played in Germany with Limburg EG of the German Tier-1 League. He would then play professional ice hockey in North America, as he played in the former West Coast Hockey League with the Bakersfield Condors. Prior to playing for Bakersfield, he appeared in a few exhibition games with the now-defunct Tacoma Sabercats.

References 

1971 births
Bakersfield Condors (1998–2015) players
Canadian ice hockey centres
Sportspeople from Kamloops
Kamloops Blazers players
Living people
Penticton Knights players
Vancouver VooDoo players
Swift Current Broncos players
Tri-City Americans players
Ice hockey people from British Columbia